Kristin Hannah (born September 25, 1960) is an American writer. Her most notable works include Winter Garden, The Nightingale, Firefly Lane, The Great Alone, and The Four Winds.

Biography
Kristin Hannah was born in California. After graduating with a degree in communication from the University of Washington, Hannah worked at an advertising agency in Seattle. She graduated from the University of Puget Sound law school and practiced law in Seattle before becoming a full-time writer. Hannah wrote her first novel with her mother, who was dying of cancer at the time; the book was never published.

Hannah's best-selling work, The Nightingale, has sold over 4.5 million copies worldwide and has been published in 45 languages.

Hannah lives on Bainbridge Island, Washington, with her husband and their son.

Bibliography

Standalone novels
A Handful of Heaven (July 1991)
The Enchantment (June 1992)
Once in Every Life	(December 1992)
If You Believe (December 1993)
When Lightning Strikes (October 1994)
Waiting for the Moon (September 1995)
Home Again	(October 1996)
On Mystic Lake (February 1999)
Angel Falls (April 2000)
Summer Island (March 2001)
Distant Shores (July 2002)
Between Sisters (April 2003)
The Things We Do for Love (June 2004)
Comfort and Joy (October 2005)
Magic Hour	(February 2006)
Firefly Lane (2008)
True Colors (2009)
Winter Garden (2010)
Night Road (March 2011)
Home Front (2012)
Fly Away (2013)
The Nightingale (2015)
The Great Alone (2018)
The Four Winds (2021)

Omnibus
On Mystic Lake / Summer Island (2005)
Firefly Lane / Fly Away (2008, 2013)

Anthologies in collaboration
"Liar's Moon" in Harvest Hearts 1993 (with Joanne Cassity, Sharon Harlow and Rebecca Paisley)
Of Love and Life 2000 (with Janice Graham and Philippa Gregory)
"Liar's Moon" in With Love 2002 (with Jennifer Blake and Linda Lael Miller)

Film and TV

Three of Hannah's novels have been optioned for films: Home Front, The Nightingale, and The Great Alone.

Firefly Lane was turned into a Netflix original series, starring Sarah Chalke and Katherine Heigl, which premiered on February 3, 2021.

References and sources

External links
Official website
Kristin Hannah Books In Order

1960 births
American romantic fiction writers
RITA Award winners
Living people
Writers from Bainbridge Island, Washington
University of Washington College of Arts and Sciences alumni
Seattle University School of Law alumni
Writers from California